Yu Hui-hyeong (born 10 March 1949) is a South Korean basketball player. He competed in the men's tournament at the 1968 Summer Olympics.

References

External links
 

1949 births
Living people
South Korean men's basketball players
1970 FIBA World Championship players
Olympic basketball players of South Korea
Basketball players at the 1968 Summer Olympics
Asian Games medalists in basketball
Basketball players at the 1970 Asian Games
Basketball players at the 1974 Asian Games
Asian Games gold medalists for South Korea
Asian Games silver medalists for South Korea
Medalists at the 1970 Asian Games
Medalists at the 1974 Asian Games